Virginia Hewlett Douglass (June 1, 1849 – December 14, 1889), also known as Virginia Lewis Molyneaux Hewlett Douglass was an African-American suffragist. She had been married to Frederick Douglass, Jr.

Biography 
Virginia Lewis Molyneaux Hewlett was born June 1, 1849 in Cambridge, Massachusetts. She was the daughter of the first African-American instructor at Harvard University (from 1859 to circa 1871), Aaron Molyneaux Hewlett and physical education instructor, Virginia Josephine Lewis Molyneaux Hewlett (c.1821–1882).

On August 4, 1869, Virginia Hewlett Douglass married Frederick Douglass, Jr. in Cambridge. Together they had seven children, Fredrick Aaron Douglass (1870–1886), Virginia Anna Douglass (1871–1872), Lewis Emmanuel Douglass (c.1874–1875), Maud Ardell Douglass (1877–1877), Gertrude Pearl Douglass (1883–1887), Robert Smalls Douglass (1886–1910), Charles Paul Douglass (1879–1895). When her sister-in-law Mary Elizabeth Murphy (married to Charles Remond Douglass) died in 1879, Virginia and Fredrick raised their two minor children Charles Frederick and Joseph Henry.

In 1877, a petition for women's suffrage support by the District of Columbia African-American community was created and signed by Virginia Hewlett Douglass, Frederick Douglass, Jr., Nathan Sprague, and Rosetta Douglass Sprague. The petition had been part of a movement organized by National Woman Suffrage Association.

On September 21, 1881, Douglass wrote a letter to the editor of the Washington Sunday Item newspaper against school segregation and prejudice.

She died in December 14, 1889, at the age of 41, and her death was listed as from consumption. She was buried in Graceland Cemetery and later moved to Woodlawn Cemetery in Washington DC. After her death, her brother Emanuel D. Molyneaux Hewlett took custody of her two minor children, Charles Paul and Robert Smalls.

References 

1849 births
1889 deaths
African-American suffragists
American suffragists
People from Cambridge, Massachusetts
Douglass family
Burials at Woodlawn Cemetery (Washington, D.C.)
19th-century deaths from tuberculosis
Tuberculosis deaths in the United States